Ionuţ Arghir Buzean (born 18 September 1982) is a Romanian footballer who plays for Liga IV side ACS Mediaș. He played almost his entire career for Gaz Metan Mediaş.

Personal life
In June 2012, Ionuț married his longtime girlfriend and fiancé, Romanian professional tennis player Diana Enache.

Honours
Gaz Metan Mediaş
Liga II: 1999–00, 2015–16
Petrolul Ploieşti
Liga II: 2002–03

References

External links

1982 births
Living people
Romanian footballers
CS Gaz Metan Mediaș players
FC Petrolul Ploiești players
Liga I players
Liga II players
Association football forwards